Saša Babić (born 4 August 1989) is a Croatian futsal player who plays for MNK Kijevo Knauf and the Croatia national futsal team.

References

External links 
UEFA profile

1989 births
Living people
Croatian men's futsal players